Jathara Parivartanasana (Sanskrit ञठर परिवर्तनासन), Revolved Abdomen pose, Belly twist, or Spinal twist is a reclining twist asana in modern yoga as exercise.

Etymology and origins

The name is from the Sanskrit ञठर Jaṭhara, stomach or abdomen; परिवर्तन Parivartana, to turn around; and आसन āsana, posture or seat. The pose is not found in medieval hatha yoga texts, but is described in 20th century manuals including B. K. S. Iyengar's 1966 Light on Yoga.

Description 

The full pose, sometimes called Jathara Parivartanasana B, is entered from a supine position, with the arms outspread on the ground, level with the shoulders. For the full pose, the legs are raised straight up and then lowered to one side, keeping the opposite shoulder on the ground. 

In Ashtanga Vinyasa Yoga, the pose is used cautiously, in combination with deep muscle exercises, to help relieve low back pain: it is not sufficient on its own as the strength of core muscles along the spine also needs to be developed.

Variations 

For an easier pose, sometimes called Jathara Parivartanasana A, the knees are bent over the body, and rotated to one side; the legs may then be straightened.

In Iyengar Yoga, the hips are moved a little away from the side the legs will descend before the rotation. A weight may be held in the hand on the opposite side. The pose may also be practised with the legs descending half-way down.

See also

 Supta Matsyendrasana – a similar supine spinal twist, one leg remaining straight out on the ground

Notes

References

Sources

 
 

Twisting asanas
Reclining asanas
Asymmetric asanas